The Kirch–Ford House, also known as the Kirch–Ford–Terrill House, is a historic house museum at 1 Reinman Road in Warren Township, Somerset County, New Jersey. The house was added to the National Register of Historic Places on October 20, 1988, for its significance in architecture and exploration/settlement.

References

External links
 

Warren Township, New Jersey
Houses in Somerset County, New Jersey
Historic house museums in New Jersey
Federal architecture in New Jersey
National Register of Historic Places in Somerset County, New Jersey
Houses on the National Register of Historic Places in New Jersey
New Jersey Register of Historic Places